The 2016–17 Denmark Series was the 52nd season of the Denmark Series, the fourth-tier of the Danish football league structure organised by the Danish FA (DBU). The league was divided in four pools of ten teams each. The winner of each pool was to be promoted to the 2017–18 Danish 2nd Division, while the last place team would be relegated to a lower division and bottom two teams of each pool in danger of playing relegation-playoff (depending on Danish 2nd Division results).

Participants

Group 1

League table

Group 2

League table

Group 3

League table

Group 4

League table

References

3
Danish 2nd Divisions
Denmark Series seasons